Letter cutting is a form of inscriptional architectural lettering closely related to monumental masonry and stone carving, often practised by artists, sculptors, and typeface designers. Rather than traditional stone carving, where images and symbols are the dominant features, in letter cutting the unique skill is "meticulous setting out and skilled cutting of the lettering style, in terms of design, angle and depth of the lettering". 

"However, the majority of letter cutting is now manufactured using methods such as sand blasting and laser etching".  

Notable practitioners include: 
Nicholas Benson
Eric Gill
Ralph Beyer 
Michael Harvey
David Kindersley
Richard Kindersley
John Shaw
Reynolds Stone
Macdonald Gill
Bryant Fedden

References

Masonry
Artisans
Arts occupations
Monumental masons
Calligraphy